The 1849 Wisconsin gubernatorial election was held on November 6, 1849. Democrat Nelson Dewey won the election with 52% of the vote, winning his second term as Governor of Wisconsin. Dewey defeated Whig Party candidate Alexander L. Collins and Free Soil Party candidate Warren Chase.

This was the second Wisconsin gubernatorial election, and the first election for a full two-year gubernatorial term.

Democratic Party

Nelson Dewey was the incumbent governor, having been elected in the 1848 election.  He was a prominent lawyer and real-estate investor in Grant County, Wisconsin. He did extensive business with the lead-mining industry, which was a major component of the economy of the Wisconsin Territory.  He had been a member of nearly every session of the Wisconsin Territorial Legislature, first as a member of the Territorial Assembly, from 1838 to 1842, then as a member of the Territorial Council from 1842 to 1846.  He served as Speaker of the Territorial Assembly in 1840, and President of the Territorial Council in 1846.

Other candidates
Although Dewey was renominated on the first ballot, two other names were placed in candidacy for the Democratic gubernatorial nomination at the 1849 State Democratic Convention, held in Madison:
 Harrison Carroll Hobart, of Sheboygan, was a state senator and prominent lawyer.  He had also served in the  Wisconsin Territorial House of Representatives.
 William Rudolph Smith, of Mineral Point, had been a colonel in the War of 1812 and served in the Pennsylvania General Assembly before moving to the Wisconsin Territory.  In Wisconsin, he negotiated an important treaty with the Chippewa, obtaining a portion of their land, and had been a delegate to Wisconsin's first constitutional convention.

Nomination

| colspan="6" style="text-align:center;background-color: #e9e9e9;"| Vote of the Wisconsin Democratic Convention, September 6, 1849

Free Soil Party

Warren Chase was, at the time of the 1849 election, a member of the Wisconsin State Senate, having been elected on the Democratic Party ticket in 1848.  He represented Fond du Lac and Winnebago counties.  Chase was an abolitionist and temperance advocate, and was one of only three delegates to attend both the first and second Wisconsin constitutional conventions.  Chase was also notable for his fourierist beliefs, having participated in the founding of the Wisconsin phalanx (commune) at Ceresco, Wisconsin.

Whig Party

Alexander L. Collins was a prominent lawyer in Madison.  At the time of the 1849 election, he was a member of the first Board of Regents of the University of Wisconsin.  He had been the Whig Party candidate for United States Congress in the 2nd congressional district in 1848.  He also served in the Wisconsin Territorial Legislature from 1846 until the territorial government was replaced by the state government in 1848.

Results

| colspan="6" style="text-align:center;background-color: #e9e9e9;"| General Election, November 6, 1849

Results by County

References

Gubernatorial
1849
Wisconsin
1849 in Wisconsin
November 1849 events